The Pier in Płock is a pleasure pier in Płock, Poland, reaching into the Vistula River. The pier in Płock is also a part of the marina. The pedestrian pier in Płock is 358 metres (1174.54 feet) long, 5.3 metres (17.39 feet) wide, except for the end of the pier, which is 15.3 metres (50.20 feet) wide. At the end of the pier is situated a restaurant. The pier is a steel structure.

History
A distinctive feature of the pier in Płock is the fact that this structure was made mostly parallel to the riverbank. It's the only pier of this type in Poland. A cafe is at the end of the pier. The pier is adapted for people using wheelchairs. The pier is open all through the year. Admission to the pier is free.

Construction of the pier lasted from March 2010 till December 2014 and is on going although open. The general contractor for the investment was a consortium headed by the company Bilfinger Berger Budownictwo.

Gallery

References

External links
 The pier in Płock live webcam
 The pier in Płock in interactive panoramic photos

Piers in Poland